Mathias Toon Cecil Willy De Clercq, esq. (born 26 December 1981, Ghent) is a Belgian politician. He is a member of the Flemish liberal party. At the moment he is the mayor of Ghent. From 2007 until 2014, he was  a federal representative, and from 2014 until 2019, he was a Flemish representative. From 2007 until 2019, he was a schepen in Ghent. He belongs to the social liberal wing of his party.

De Clercq was born in Ghent, son of lawyer and alderman Yannick Frans de Clercq (1954), grand officer of the Order of Leopold II.  He is the grandson of Viscount Willy De Clercq, a former European Commissioner.

References

External links

1981 births
Mayors of Ghent
Open Vlaamse Liberalen en Democraten politicians
Living people
21st-century Belgian politicians
Belgian nobility